Statistics of the Scottish Professional Football League in season 2015–16.

Scottish Premiership

Scottish Championship

Scottish League One

Scottish League Two

Award winners

Yearly

Monthly

See also
2015–16 in Scottish football

References

 
Scottish Professional Football League seasons